Jorge Luis Anchén Cajiga (born 17 August 1980) is a Uruguayan former football midfielder who played in Argentina, Colombia, Sweden and Uruguay.

Career
Born in Montevideo, Anchén started his professional career in 1999 with Danubio FC. After a loan spell with Argentinos Juniors in 2005-2006 he returned to Uruguay to join Bella Vista.

At the beginning of 2008 he moved to Sweden to join AIK from Bella Vista after one year with AIK he joined San Martín de Tucumán of Argentina.

Afterwards Anchén played for Deportivo Pasto in Colombia.

International
He has been capped 6 times for Uruguay, six times on senior level. Anchén represented his country in the 1999 FIFA World Youth Championship and in 2001 he was selected to play for Uruguay in the Copa América 2001.

References

External links
 Argentine Primera statistics
 Profile at Tenfield

1980 births
Living people
Footballers from Montevideo
Uruguayan footballers
Uruguay international footballers
Uruguay under-20 international footballers
Uruguayan expatriate footballers
Danubio F.C. players
C.A. Bella Vista players
AIK Fotboll players
Argentinos Juniors footballers
San Martín de Tucumán footballers
Deportivo Pasto footballers
Rampla Juniors players
Expatriate footballers in Argentina
Expatriate footballers in Colombia
2001 Copa América players
Uruguayan Primera División players
Argentine Primera División players
Allsvenskan players

Association football midfielders
Association football defenders